Markquez Lao Santiago (born April 11, 1988), known professionally as Kid Buu, is a rapper and singer based in South Miami, Florida. His career has been marked by his attempts to generate controversy as well as his run-ins with the law, including allegations of domestic and child abuse.

Early life and career 
Markquez Santiago was born on April 11, 1988, at St. Elizabeth Child Care Center in Jersey City, New Jersey. He later moved with his brother, Jason, and his mother to South Florida, specifically the Hialeah and Opa-locka areas, in search of a better life. As a child, Valentine took martial arts classes. He attended public school before being home-schooled. He recalls the death of friends in harsh neighborhoods as well as having come from poverty as motivators for a better life. He is of Sicilian and Puerto Rican descent.

In late 2018, Santiago changed his stage name from "Humongous The God" to "Kid Buu", in reference to his favorite Dragon Ball Z character, and for his love of anime. The "Majin" tattoo between his eyes, his fangs and his pink hair further promote this persona.

Personal life 
In 2019, Santiago was convicted on charges of child abuse following a domestic dispute with then girlfriend Blac Chyna. 

Santiago is a Raëlian.

Discography

Albums

Compilation albums

Collaborative albums

Mixtapes

Extended plays

References

1988 births
21st-century American rappers
Raëlians
Island Records artists
Living people
Rappers from Miami
American people of Italian descent
American people of Puerto Rican descent
Age controversies